The Plant is an unfinished serial novel by American writer Stephen King, published in 1982–1985 privately and in 2000 as a commercial e-book.

The story, told in epistolary format consisting entirely of letters, memos and correspondence, is about an editor in a paperback publishing house who gets a manuscript from what appears to be a crackpot. The manuscript is about magic, but it also contains photographs that seem very real. The editor writes the author a rejection slip, but because of the photographs, he also informs the police where the author lives. This enrages the author, who sends a mysterious plant to the editor's office.

History
King wrote a few parts of a story by the same name and sent them out as chapbooks to his friends, instead of Christmas cards, in 1982, 1983, and 1985. Philtrum Press produced just three installments before the story was shelved, and the original editions have been hotly sought-after collector's items.

In 2000, King published the novella Riding the Bullet over the Internet, making it the world's first mass market e-book. However, there were technical problems with downloading, and hackers eventually cracked the encryption. Later that year, King released The Plant directly via his website, unencrypted and in installments. People could pay a $1 fee for each installment using the honor system. King said, however, that he would drop the project if the percentage of paying readers fell below 75 percent. He viewed the release as an experiment in alternate forms of distribution, writing on his website at the time, "My friends, we have the chance to become Big Publishing's worst nightmare."

The book received more than the desired 75 percent for its first installment, but it fell to 70 percent after installment two. With the third installment, the numbers surged back to 75 percent. However, while the first installment was downloaded and paid for 120,000 times, the fifth was only downloaded 40,000 times, and many people did not pay, so King suspended the project. All told, after six installments, King revealed that he had made nearly half a million dollars from the release of The Plant, in what has been called his e-book experiment.

The last installment was published on December 18, 2000. The book has yet to be completed. The original installments are now available free of charge on King's official website.

Publication history

References

2000 American novels
Novels by Stephen King
Epistolary novels
Unfinished novels
Novels first published in serial form
Novels first published online
Philtrum Press books